Oskar Halecki (26 May 1891, Vienna, Cisleithania, Austria-Hungary – 17 September 1973, White Plains, New York, United States of America) was a Polish historian, social and Catholic activist.

Life and career
Halecki, whose first name is sometimes spelled Oscar in English-language sources, was born in Vienna to a Polish officer serving in the Austrian Army. His father, Oscar Chalecki-Halecki, achieved the rank of lieutenant field-marshal. His mother was Leopoldina deDellimanic.

After graduating with a doctorate from the Jagiellonian University (1909–1913), he served briefly as a research assistant to Bronisław Dembiński in Warsaw, before continuing his education at the University of Vienna (1914–1915). He secured his first teaching position in 1915 as a docent at his alma mater, the Jagiellonian University. He was disqualified from military service due to poor eyesight. In his early years, Halecki wore pince-nez, which combined with his mustache gave him an aristocratic appearance. Halecki moved to the Warsaw University in 1918, where he was appointed to a chair of East European history.

After the Armistice was signed, Halecki was appointed secretary general of a committee of experts attached to the Polish Delegation at the Paris Peace Conference. Even though he had been appointed as dean of the Faculty of Philosophy at the Jagiellonian (1920), Halecki spent a decade in international service. In 1921, he was appointed as a member of the League of Nations Secretariat in Geneva, where he spent three years organising that body's Committee on Intellectual Co-operation. He then spent a year in Paris as Chief of the University Section in the league's Institute on Intellectual Co-operation and then spent several years working on its various commissions. After a ten-year absence, Halecki returned to his professorship at the University of Warsaw until 1939 during which he also served as dean of the Faculty of Humanities (1930–1931). In 1938, he went to the United States as a visiting scholar of the Kosciuszko Foundation, giving over forty lectures at colleges and universities.

Halecki was attending a conference in Fribourg when Germany invaded Poland, which triggered the Second World War. Rather than returning to occupied Poland, he went to Paris, where he organized the Polish University in Exile and served as its president, taught at the Sorbonne and edited the émigré periodical La Voix de Varsovie. When Germany invaded France in 1940, Halecki escaped to the United States with the help of Stephen Mizwa and the Kosciuszko Foundation, where he spent two years as a visiting professor of history at Vassar College before he became executive director of the new Polish Institute of Arts and Sciences in America, which was conceived as an American outpost of the Polska Akademia Umiejętności. Bronisław Malinowski was its first president, and Halecki became its president from 1952 to 1964.

Halecki became a professor of Eastern European history at Fordham University from 1944 to 1961, and he was also affiliated with the University of Montreal from 1944 to 1951 and an adjunct professor at Columbia University from 1955 to 1961, where he contributed to the prestige of Columbia's Institute on East Central Europe. After his "retirement" in 1961, he was a visiting professor at Loyola University in Rome (1962–1963), University of Fribourg (1963), University of California at Los Angeles (1963–1964), and Good Counsel College (1964–1967).

As a historian, Halecki was an expert on the Polish–Lithuanian Commonwealth, which laid the foundation for his thesis that Eastern Europe, distinct from Russia was no less European than Western Europe and that they were both part of one great European community of people that shared the same spiritual ideals and cultural traditions. His work led to the gradual acceptance of the concept and name of East Central Europe. His magnum opus was a two-volume history of the Jagiellonian Union, published in 1919–1920. Much of his retirement was occupied with working on a biography of Jadwiga of Anjou that was published two decades after his death.

Halecki also served on the controversial "Committee of Ten" in Scarsdale, New York, which claimed communist influence in the public school curriculum in the 1950s.

Among the many students he mentored were Thaddeus V. Gromada, Taras Hunczak, and Eugene Kusielewicz.

Halecki was married to Helen de Sulima-Szarlowska, who died in 1964.

Honors and recognition
Halecki received honorary doctorates from the University of Lyon, the University of Montreal, De Paul University, Fordham University, and Saint Peter's College. He was Papal Chamberlain and Knight of the Grand Cross, Order of Malta; Commander of the Order of Polonia Restituta; Commander of Saint Gregory; Commander, Hungarian Croix de Merite; and Chevalier, Légion d'honneur.  Halecki received the Polish American Historical Association's first Haiman Award (1966) for outstanding contributions to Polish American studies. In 1981, the Polish American Historical Association established the Halecki Prize, given to recognize an important book or monograph on the Polish experience in the United States.

Bibliography
Publications by Halecki:
Dzieje unii jagiellońskiej (2 vols., 1919-1920).
 (fr) Un empereur de Byzance æ Rome : vingt ans de travail pour l'union des églises et pour la défense de l'empire d'orient : 1355 - 1375 (1930)
  (fr) Rome et Byzance au temps du grand schisme d'occident (1937)
East Central Europe in postwar organization (1943)
The Crusade of Varna: A Discussion of Controversial Problems (1943)
Borderlands of Western Civilization: A History of East Central Europe (1952)
History of Poland
 (fr) Histoire de Pologne (1945)
Imperialism in Slavic and East European History (1952)
Pius XII: Eugenio Pacelli: Pope of peace (1954)
From Florence to Brest 1439–1596 (1958)
The Limits and Divisions of European History (1962)
The Millennium of Europe (1963)
(posthumous) Jadwiga of Anjou and the rise of East Central Europe, edited by Thaddeus V. Gromada (1991)
Publications about Halecki:
The American Catholic Who's Who, Vol. 14: 1960 and 1961.
Thaddeus V. Gromada, "The Contributions of Oscar Halecki to American Historical Scholarship," Nationalities Papers, Vol. 4, no. 2 (1976): 89–97.
Thaddeus V. Gromada, "Oscar Halecki, 1891-1973," Slavic Review, Vol. 33, no. 1 (1974): 203-204 in JSTOR.
Oskar Halecki, "Oskar Halecki, Historian," in Walter Romig (ed.), The Book of Catholic Authors (Third Series): Informal Self-Portraits of Famous Modern Catholic Writers (Walter Romig & Co., 1945), 157–163.
Kenneth F. Lewalski, "Oscar Halecki," in Hans A. Schmitt (ed.), Historians of Modern Europe (Louisiana State University Press, 1971), 36–61.
Justine Wincek, "Oscar Halecki," Polish American Studies, Vol. 24, no. 2 (1967): 106-108 in JSTOR.
Thaddeus V. Gromada (ed.), Oskar Halecki 1891-1973: Eulogies and Reflections (Tatra Eagle Press, 2013).
 Королёв Геннадий. Antemurale польской историографии: Оскар Халецкий о ягеллонской идее, федерализме и пограничье Запада // Ab Imperio. – 2015. – No. 2. – С. 363–382.

References

External links
 

1891 births
1973 deaths
Writers from Vienna
20th-century Polish historians
Polish male non-fiction writers
University of Vienna alumni
Jagiellonian University alumni
Academic staff of the University of Warsaw
Polish emigrants to the United States
Fordham University faculty
Columbia University faculty
Recipients of the Legion of Honour
Members of the Lwów Scientific Society
Diplomats of the Second Polish Republic
Members of the Polish Academy of Learning
Commanders of the Order of Polonia Restituta
Historians of Polish Americans
Polish Byzantinists
Scholars of Byzantine history